Julio Jacobo Rotemberg was an Argentine/American economist at Harvard Business School. He was known for his collaboration with Michael Woodford on the first New Keynesian DSGE model, especially on monopolistic competition. He was also known for an alternative model of sticky prices.

Rotemberg held a B.A. in economics (1975) from the University of California, Berkeley, and a Ph.D. in economics (1981) from Princeton University.

References

Selected publications 

 "Sticky Prices in the United States". Journal of Political Economy, University of Chicago Press. December 1982.
 "The New Keynesian Microfoundations". NBER Macroeconomics Annual 1987, Volume 2.
 "Human Relations in the Workplace". Journal of Political Economy. August 1994.
 Rotemberg and Garth Saloner. "A Supergame-Theoretic Model of Price Wars during Booms". American Economic Review. June 1986.

External links
 Website at Harvard

1953 births
2017 deaths
American economists
New Keynesian economists
University of California, Berkeley alumni
Princeton University alumni
Harvard Business School faculty
MIT Sloan School of Management alumni
Fellows of the Econometric Society
Distinguished Fellows of the American Economic Association
Labor economists